Pelikan was a 3,264 ton German refrigerated cargo ship built in 1934. In 1945, during the Second World War, the United Kingdom seized her and renamed her Empire Alde. She changed names twice more: back to Pelikan in 1946, and to Pacuare in 1947. She was scrapped in 1959/60.

History
Pelikan was built by Bremer Vulkan Schiff- und Maschinenbau, Bremen as yard number 712 and launched in 1934, being completed in January 1935. She was owned by the Afrikanische Frucht-Cie AG and managed by F Laeisz, Hamburg. In 1940, ownership passed to the Kriegsmarine (German navy) although Lloyds Register continued to show Pelikan as a merchant ship. In May 1945 Pelikan was seized at Brunsbüttel, and ownership passed to the Ministry of War Transport; she was renamed Empire Alde, under the management of the Southern Railway and later Kaye, Sons & Co. In 1946 Empire Alde was sold to Elders & Fyffes Ltd, regaining her original name of Pelikan before being renamed Pacuare in 1947. She served until 1959, when she was sent to Troon for scrapping, arriving on 22 September.

Official number and code letters
Official Numbers were a forerunner to IMO Numbers.

Pelikan used the Code Letters DJNP until 1945. Empire Alde, Pelican and Pacuare used the UK Official Number 181664 from 1945-59

References

1934 ships
Ships built in Bremen (state)
Merchant ships of Germany
World War II merchant ships of Germany
Auxiliary ships of the Kriegsmarine
Empire ships
Ministry of War Transport ships
Merchant ships of the United Kingdom
Ships of the Southern Railway (UK)